Porin Pesäkarhut are a pesäpallo club based in Pori, Finland. They currently only have a women's team which competes in the Superpesis. The club was established in 1985. They play in the Erku-Areena. They have won the Finnish Championship twice, in 2002 and in 2021.

Honours 

Etenijäkuningatar:
 Carita Toiviainen (2007)
 Kaisa Kärkkäinen (2010)
 Milla Lindström (2013, 2017)
 Emilia Itävalo (2021)

Lyöjäkuningatar:
 Heidi Kuusisto (2010)
 Hanna Itävalo (2013)
 Susanna Puisto (2020, 2021)

Kärkilyöntikuningatar:
 Hanna Itävalo (2009, 2010)
 Kaisa Kärkkäinen (2011)
 Carita Toiviainen (2013, 2015)

Playoffs' most valuable player:
 Tiia Peltonen (2021)

"Jokeri" of the year:
 Johanna Nieminen (2002)
 Tanja Vehniäinen (2005)
 Heidi Kuusisto (2007, 2008, 2010)

"Lukkari" of the year:
 Kaisa Salmela (2012)

Baseballer of the year:
 Jonna Äijälä (2002)
 Kaisa Kärkkäinen (2010)
 Carita Toiviainen (2013)
 Susanne Ojaniemi (2017)
 Emilia Itävalo (2019)

Kultainen maila- award:
 Hanna Itävalo (2009)
 Susanne Ojaniemi (2017)

Kultainen räpylä- award:
 Susanne Ojaniemi (2017)
 Emilia Itävalo (2019)

Notes

References 

Pesäpallo
Sport in Pori
1985 establishments in Finland
Women's sports teams in Finland